The Wah Wah Mountains are a north-south trending range in west-central Utah, part of the larger Basin and Range Province. It is bounded by Pine Valley to the west, Wah Wah Valley to the east, the Escalante Desert to the south, and on trend with the Confusion Range to the north. The Wah Wah Mountains are located in Beaver and Millard counties.

The "Wah Wah" name comes from Wah Wah Springs, on the eastern slope of the mountain range.  "Wah Wah" is reported to mean "good clear water".

The Bureau of Land Management, which administers most of the land within the Wah Wah Mountains, has designated two wilderness study areas, one in the north and one in the central portion of the range.

Geology 

The Wah Wah Mountains are made up of  Neoproterozoic- to Paleozoic-aged sedimentary rocks (limestone, dolomite, shale, and sandstone metamorphized into quartzite), overlain by younger Tertiary volcanic rocks (basalt, andesite, dacite, rhyolite, and tuff) on the eastern flank of the range. A series of thrust faults cut through the sedimentary rocks in the southern end of the range.  It is notable as the source of a rare red beryl gemstone, which is mined commercially.  Perhaps, the most famous geologic feature is Crystal Peak, in the northern part of the range (near the pass between the Wah Wah Mountains and the Confusion Range). It is an erosional remnant of a Paleogene rhyolite tuff that has abundant doubly terminated crystals of quartz. The Wah Wah Mountains were the site of a massive supervolcano eruption 30 million years ago that ejected more than 5,900 cubic kilometers of material. An additional reference to the geology of the range is the map by Hintze and Davis.

In other media
 The Wah Wah Mountains are featured in the science fiction novel EarthCore by Scott Sigler.

References 

Mountain ranges of Beaver County, Utah
Mountain ranges of Millard County, Utah
Mountain ranges of Utah
Mountain ranges of Iron County, Utah